James Francis "Frank" Hurley  (15 October 1885 – 16 January 1962) was an Australian photographer and adventurer. He participated in a number of expeditions to Antarctica and served as an official photographer with Australian forces during both world wars. He was the official photographer for the Australasian Antarctic Expedition and the Imperial Trans-Antarctic Expedition of 1914-16.

His artistic style produced many memorable images. He also used staged scenes, composites and photographic manipulation.

Early life 
Frank Hurley was the third of five children to parents Edward and Margaret Hurley and was raised in Glebe, a suburb of Sydney, Australia. He ran away from home at the age of 13 to work on the Lithgow steel mill, returning home two years later to study at the local technical school and attend science lectures at the University of Sydney.

When he was 17 he bought his first camera, a 15-shilling Kodak Box Brownie which he paid for at the rate of a shilling per week. He taught himself photography and set himself up in the postcard business, where he gained a reputation for putting himself in danger in order to produce stunning images, including placing himself in front of an oncoming train to capture it on film.

Hurley married Antoinette Rosalind Leighton on 11 April 1918. The couple had four children: identical twin daughters, Adelie (later a press photographer) and Toni, one son, Frank, and youngest daughter Yvonne.

Antarctic expeditions 

During his lifetime, Hurley spent more than four years in Antarctica. At the age of 23, in 1908, Hurley learned that Australian explorer Douglas Mawson was planning an expedition to Antarctica; fellow Sydney-sider Henri Mallard in 1911, recommended Hurley for the position of official photographer to Mawson's Australasian Antarctic Expedition, ahead of himself.

Hurley asserts in his biography that he then cornered Mawson as he was making his way to their interview on a train, using the advantage to talk his way into the job. Mawson was persuaded, while Mallard, who was the manager of Harringtons—a local Kodak franchise—to which Hurley was in debt, provided photographic equipment. The expedition departed in 1911, returning in 1914. On his return, he edited and released a documentary, Home of the Blizzard, using his footage from the expedition.

Hurley was also the official photographer on Sir Ernest Shackleton's Imperial Trans-Antarctic Expedition which set out in 1914 and was marooned until August 1916; Hurley's photographic kit for the expedition included the cinematograph machine, plate still camera and several smaller Kodak cameras, along with various lenses, tripods, and developing equipment, most of which had to be abandoned with the loss of their ship Endurance in 1915. He kept only a hand-held Vest Pocket Kodak camera and three rolls of film and for the rest of the expedition, he shot a total of just 38 images. He also selected and saved 120 of his glass-plate negatives smashing about 400 remaining ones. Some of the plates from the expedition are now part of the State Library of New South Wales collection.

Hurley produced many pioneering colour images of the expedition using the then-popular Paget process of colour photography. He photographed in South Georgia in 1917. He later compiled his records into the documentary film South in 1919. His footage was also used in the 2001 IMAX film Shackleton's Antarctic Adventure. He then returned to the Antarctic in 1929 and 1931, on Mawson's British Australian and New Zealand Antarctic Research Expedition.

Wartime photography 

In 1917, Hurley joined the Australian Imperial Force (AIF) as an honorary captain, and captured many stunning battlefield scenes during the Third Battle of Ypres. In keeping with his adventurous spirit, he took considerable risks to photograph his subjects, also producing many rare panoramic and colour photographs of the conflict. Hurley kept a diary from 1917 to 1918, chronicling his time as a war photographer. In it, he described his commitment "to illustrate to the public the things our fellows do and how war is conducted", and his short-lived resignation in October 1917 when he was ordered not to produce composite images—a practice that was especially popular among professional photographers at the time and one that he believed could portray the disgust and horror that he felt during the war in such a way that his audience would feel it too. His period with the AIF ended in March 1918.

For the 1918 London exhibition, Australian War Pictures and Photographs, he employed composites for photomurals to convey drama of the war on a scale otherwise not possible using the technology available. This brought Hurley into conflict with the AIF on the grounds that montage diminished documentary value. He wrote that he would dress in civilian clothes and eavesdrop on soldiers who were visiting his exhibitions; he concluded that the composites were justified by the favourable comments they attracted. Charles Bean, official war historian, labelled Hurley's composite images "fake".

Hurley again worked as an official photographer during the Second World War.  He was employed by the Australian Department of Information as head of the Photographic Unit from September 1940 until early  1943, based in Cairo. He took the only film of the initial victory against the Italians at Sidi Barrani in December 1940, which was given to Cinesound and Movietone News for global release.  He also covered the battle of Bardia and the Siege of Tobruk in 1941, and both of the battles at El Alamein in 1942. Several volumes of his War Diaries cover this period.

In early 1943, the AIF 9th Division was recalled to Australia to fight the Japanese forces in the Pacific theatre.  Hurley resigned his position, but remained in the Middle East, and accepted the position of Middle East Director of Army Features and Propaganda Films with the British Ministry of Information. In this capacity, he travelled a reported 200,000 miles covering the region from Libya to Persia, making regular items for War Pictorial News and 2-reel features.  He photographed two conferences of leaders at Cairo and Teheran in 1943.  Only one diary volume survives for this period. It includes a summary of his 1943 work, and covers a four-month journey from Cairo to Teheran commencing in February 1944, during which he took footage for The Road to Russia (1944),  A Day in the Life of a King (1944), possibly the first film of the Marsh Arabs  Garden of Eden (1945), and one other feature about Teheran itself.   Other features of this period include Cairo (1944), and The Holy Land (1945). Hurley returned to Australia in September 1946.

Cinematography 

Hurley also used a film camera to record a range of experiences including the Antarctic expeditions, the building of the Sydney Harbour Bridge, and war in the Middle East during World War II. The camera was a Debrie Parvo L 35 mm hand-crank camera made in France. This camera is now in the collection of the National Museum of Australia.

Hurley made several documentaries throughout his career, most notably Pearls and Savages (1921). He wrote and directed several dramatic feature films, including Jungle Woman (1926) and The Hound of the Deep (1926). He also worked as cinematographer for Cinesound Productions where his best known film credits include The Squatter's Daughter (1933), The Silence of Dean Maitland (1934) and Grandad Rudd (1935).

See also 
 Photography in Australia

References

Bibliography 
 Hurley, Frank, 1885–1962 & Ponting, Herbert, 1870–1935 & Boddington, Jennie, 1922– (1979). Antarctic photographs 1910–1916. Macmillan, London
  Dixon Robert (2012).Photography, early cinema and colonial modernity : Frank Hurley's synchronised lecture entertainments.
 Edited by Robert Dixon and Christopher Lee (2011).The Diaries of 1912–1941.
 
 
 
 Jolly, Martyn. "Australian First–World–War photography Frank Hurley and Charles Bean." History of photography 23.2 (1999): 141–148. https://doi.org/10.1080/03087298.1999.10443814

External links 

 
 
 

1885 births
1962 deaths
Australian Army officers
Military personnel from New South Wales
Australian explorers
Australian military personnel of World War I
Australian Officers of the Order of the British Empire
World War II photographers
Australian photojournalists
Explorers of Antarctica
Imperial Trans-Antarctic Expedition
Journalists from Sydney
People from the Inner West (Sydney)
Photographers from New South Wales
Recipients of the Polar Medal
World War I photographers
Writers from Sydney
20th-century Australian photographers
People from Glebe, New South Wales